Simon Patrick (8 September 1626 – 31 May 1707) was an English theologian and bishop.

Life

He was born at Gainsborough, Lincolnshire, eldest son of Henry  Patrick, a wealthy merchant, on 8 September 1626, and attended Boston Grammar School. He entered Queens' College, Cambridge, in 1644, and after taking orders in 1651 became successively chaplain to Sir Walter St. John and vicar of Battersea, Surrey. He was afterwards (1662) preferred to the rectory of St. Paul's, Covent Garden, London, where he continued to labour during the plague.

He was appointed Dean of Peterborough in 1679, and Bishop of Chichester in 1689, in which year he was employed, along with others of the new bishops, to settle the affairs of the Church in Ireland. In 1691 he was translated to the see of Ely, which he held until his death on 31 May 1707. He was buried in Ely Cathedral.  His memorial is by Edward Stanton.

He had Dalham Hall built.

Works
His sermons and devotional writings are numerous, and his Commentary on the Historical and Poetical Books of the Old Testament, in 10 vols., going as far as the Song of Solomon, was reprinted in the 1810 Critical Commentary on the Old and New Testaments and Apocrypha, along with works of Richard Arnald, Moses Lowman, William Lowth, and Daniel Whitby.

Patrick's Friendly Debate between a Conformist and a Nonconformist was a controversial tract, defending the Five Mile Act. It excited considerable feeling at the time of its publication in 1668. Among replies was one from Samuel Rolle as Philagathus. He also contributed to a volume of Poems upon Divine and Moral Subjects (1719).

The first collected edition of his works appeared at Oxford in 1858 (9 vols.), edited by Alexander Taylor; a small Autobiography was published also at Oxford in 1839.

He is the author of the anti-semitic pamphlet, "Jewish Hypocrisie, A Caveat To The Present Generation."

Theology
Simon Patrick, was influenced by prominent Arminian theologians as Henry Hammond, and the Cambridge Platonists; and was criticized for his Arminian belief. He is described by historians as an influential Arminian Anglican.

Marriage
In 1675 he married Penelope Jephson (died 1725), a daughter of Maj. Gen. William Jephson (1609-1658), a highly influential Member of Parliament for Stockbridge, and also a substantial landowner in Mallow, County Cork, by his wife Alicia Dynham, a daughter of Sir John Dynham of Boarstall Tower, Buckinghamshire and Penelope Wenman. They had three children, two of whom died young.

Notes and references

Citations

Sources

Attribution

External links

 Rt Rev Simon Patrick
 Facsimile of Simon Patrick's preface to Hugo Grotius' Truths of Christian Religion. Scanned by Elms College Alumnae Library.

1626 births
1707 deaths
17th-century Church of England bishops
18th-century Church of England bishops
Alumni of Queens' College, Cambridge
Arminian ministers
Arminian theologians
Bishops of Chichester
Bishops of Ely
Canons of Westminster
Deans of Peterborough
English theologians
People educated at Boston Grammar School
People from Gainsborough, Lincolnshire
17th-century Anglican theologians
18th-century Anglican theologians